Clare is a town in Bushbuckridge Local Municipality, Mpumalanga, South Africa. It lies south of the R531, west of Hluvukani. It is divided into Clare A, B & C; which together have a population of 9,586.

References

Populated places in the Bushbuckridge Local Municipality